The Organisation Committee of the Workers' Party of Korea(조선로동당 중앙위원회 조직위원회) was established in 1946 and abolished at the 4th Congress of the Workers' Party of Korea.

Title history

Members

1st term (1946–48)
Composition not made public.

2nd term (1948–56)

1st Plenary Session (1948–49)

1st Joint Plenary Session (1949–53)

3rd term (1956–61)

Noter

References

Citations

Bibliography
Books:
 
 
  

Dissertations:
 

6th Central Auditing Commission of the Workers' Party of Korea
1946 establishments in North Korea
1961 disestablishments in North Korea